Not to be confused with Nedungadu

Nedungad is a small island located in the Ernakulam district of Kerala state, in southern India. It is located in the east side of Nayarambalam.

References 

Cities and towns in Ernakulam district
Islands of Kerala
Islands of India
Populated places in India